Medieval Croatia included the following states and regions:

 Duchy of Pannonian Croatia - medieval duchy from 9th century
 Duchy of Croatia - medieval duchy, in existence between the 8th century and 925, in the center of competition between the Carolingian Empire, the Byzantine Empire and later the Venice
 Kingdom of Croatia - medieval kingdom covering most of present-day Croatia and Bosnia and Herzegovina (925–1102)
 Croatia in the union with Hungary - medieval kingdom in a personal union with the Kingdom of Hungary (1102–1526)

See also
 Croatia (disambiguation)
 Croatian (disambiguation)